The MemphisTravel.com 200 was a NASCAR Camping World Truck Series race that took place at Memphis Motorsports Park from 1998 to 2009.

Past winners

2005:  First race run at night with temporary lights.
2005–2006 & 2008–2009: Race extended due to a green–white–checker finish.

Multiple winners (drivers)

Multiple winners (teams)

Manufacturer wins

References

External links
 

NASCAR Truck Series races
Former NASCAR races